Warriors is an album by American jazz pianist Don Pullen, saxophonist Chico Freeman, bassist Fred Hopkins and drummer Bobby Battle recorded in 1978 for the Italian Black Saint label.

Reception
The Allmusic review awarded the album 4 stars.

Track listing
All compositions by Don Pullen
 "Warriors Dance: Little Don" - 31:11
 "Land of the Pharoahs" - 13:40 
Recorded at Barigozzi Studio in Milano, Italy in April 1978

Personnel
Don Pullen - piano
Chico Freeman - saxophone
Fred Hopkins - bass
Bobby Battle - drums

References

Black Saint/Soul Note albums
Don Pullen albums
1978 albums